The Alexandria International Championships or  International Championships of Alexandria  was a men's and women's international clay court tennis tournament founded in 1914. It was played at the  Alexandria Sporting Club (f. 1890), Alexandria, Egypt. The tournament ran until 1975.

Seven editions of this event were valid as the International Championships of Egypt at Alexandria.

History
The Alexandria International Championships was a combined men's and women's clay court tennis tournament founded in 1914 and played at the Alexandria Sporting Club, Alexandria, Egypt. The championships were staged until 1975. For the years 1937 '39 '46 '50 '52 '53 '55 the editions were valid as "International Championships of Egypt" when played in Alexandria. That tournament was mainly held Gezireh Sporting Club, Cairo.

Finals

Men's singles
(incomplete roll)

Women's Singles
(incomplete roll)

See also
 International Championships of Egypt (Cairo)

References

Clay court tennis tournaments
Defunct tennis tournaments in Egypt